Godzilla: Battle Legends, simply referred to as Godzilla in North America, is a fighting game based on the Godzilla film franchise, made for the Turbo Duo in 1993, developed by Alfa System and published in the United States by Hudson Soft.

When Godzilla fights a certain foe, his appearance changes to reflect the era when he battled in certain films. For example, Godzilla looks like as he did in 1955 when he fights Anguirus, and as in 1964 when he fights Rodan. This game's sequel, Godzilla: Monster War for the SNES, features fewer monsters, with the inclusion of Biollante as a playable character and Mothra.

In single player mode, only Godzilla is playable.

Characters 

 Godzilla (55, 64, 65, 71, 72, 73, 75, 89, 91 and 92)
 Anguirus
 Rodan
 King Ghidorah (Showa, Heisei and "Mecha")
 Hedorah (Final) (Hedorah uses flying mode for some of his attacks)
 Gigan
 Megalon
 Mechagodzilla (74/MK 1, 75/MK 2 and 93/Super Mechagodzilla)
 Super X  II
 Biollante (both forms rose & final, nonplayable, boss)
 Battra (Larva and Imago)

Reception
VideoGames magazine awarded it Best Turbo Duo Game of 1994.

References

Fighting games
Godzilla games
1993 video games
TurboGrafx-CD games
TurboGrafx-CD-only games
Video games developed in Japan
Multiplayer and single-player video games
Toho
Alfa System games
Hudson Soft games